Craspedia glauca, commonly known as billy buttons, is an erect annual or perennial herb endemic to Tasmania. It is usually an annual herb with pale green leaves in a rosette and yellow button-like flowers on a tall stem.

Description

References

Gnaphalieae
Flora of Australia
Plants described in 1826